Gilyar is a rural locality (a selo) in Magaramkentsky District, Republic of Dagestan, Russia. The population was 2,022 as of 2010. There are 23 streets.

Geography 
Gilyar is located on the left bank of the Samur River, 11 km southwest of Magaramkent (the district's administrative centre) by road. Kuysun and Dzhepel are the nearest rural localities.

Nationalities 
Lezgins live there.

References 

Rural localities in Magaramkentsky District